Jerry Eisenberg (born December 14, 1937) is an American television producer, animator, storyboard artist, and character designer, primarily known for his work at Hanna-Barbera Productions and Ruby-Spears Productions.

Eisenberg was the son of Harvey Eisenberg, an animator and comic book artist associated with Tom and Jerry and the other characters from the MGM cartoon studio.  They were of German descent. Jerry Eisenberg quit art school to take his first job, as an inbetweener for MGM, in 1956. The studio closed seven months after Eisenberg's hire, and he went on to work as an assistant to Ken Harris at Warner Bros. Cartoons.

In 1961, Eisenberg was hired at Hanna-Barbera Productions, run by former MGM cartoon producers William Hanna and Joseph Barbera. Here, Eisenberg co-created The Peter Potamus Show, designed the characters on Wacky Races and Super Friends, and worked in layout on programs such as The Jetsons, The Huckleberry Hound Show, Jonny Quest, and Wacky Races. In 1977, Hanna-Barbera alumnae Joe Ruby and Ken Spears started their own studio, Ruby-Spears Productions, and hired Eisenberg as producer and character designer for Fangface, The Plastic Man Comedy/Adventure Show, and Thundarr the Barbarian.

Eisenberg later worked as a writer, storyboard artist, and/or designer and layout artist for a number of productions at various studios, including Muppet Babies at Marvel Productions, Disney's House of Mouse at Walt Disney Television Animation, Dilbert (Idbox/Columbia TriStar Television), and Adventures in Wonder Park at Nickelodeon Animation Studio. He has also worked on a number of productions for Hanna-Barbera and its successor, Warner Bros. Animation, including Johnny Bravo, Tom & Jerry Kids, and a number of Scooby-Doo direct-to-video films.

References

External links 
 

1937 births
Living people
American animators
American television writers
American male television writers
American animated film producers
American television producers
American storyboard artists
Hanna-Barbera people